Heitor is a given name (Hector  in the Portuguese language) which may refer to:
 Heitor (footballer, born 1898) (1898–1972), Ettore Marcelino Dominguez, Brazilian football striker
 Heitor (Portuguese footballer) (born 1978), Portuguese football player and coach
 Heitor (footballer, born April 2000), Heitor Marinho dos Santos, Brazilian football centre-back
 Heitor (footballer, born November 2000), Heitor Rodrigues da Fonseca, Brazilian football right-back
 Heitor Canalli (1907–1990), Brazilian football player
 Heitor Dhalia (born 1970), Brazilian film director and screenwriter
 Heitor Pereira (born 1960), Brazilian musician
 Heitor TP, a 1994 album by Heitor Pereira
 Heitor da Silva Costa (1873–1947), Brazilian civil engineer and designer of the Christ the Redeemer monument
 Heitor Villa-Lobos (1887–1959), Brazilian composer

See also
Hector